= Rodolfo María Ojea Quintana =

Rodolfo María Ojea Quintana is a former political prisoner from Argentina, who was detained on 9 February 1975 by military forces in Tucumán Province at the launch of what was called "Operativo Independencia". He was subjected to systematic torture with electric shock for several days until we was brought before a court. He spent six years in prison.

He served as the Under Minister for Foreign Affairs of Argentina from 2005 until 2010. In March 2020 he was appointed by the President of Argentina as the vice-president of the Comisión Administradora del Río Uruguay.
